Celtic mythology is the body of myths belonging to the Celtic peoples. Like other Iron Age Europeans, Celtic peoples followed a polytheistic religion, having many gods and goddesses. The mythologies of continental Celtic peoples, such as the Gauls and Celtiberians, did not survive their conquest by the Roman Empire, the loss of their Celtic languages and their subsequent conversion to Christianity. Only remnants are found in Greco-Roman sources and archaeology. Most surviving Celtic mythology belongs to the Insular Celtic peoples (the Gaels of Ireland and Scotland; the Celtic Britons of western Britain and Brittany). They preserved some of their myths in oral lore, which were eventually written down by Christian scribes in the Middle Ages. Irish mythology has the largest written body of myths, followed by Welsh mythology.

The supernatural race called the Tuatha Dé Danann are believed to be based on the main Celtic gods of Ireland, while many Welsh characters belong either to the Plant Dôn ("Children of Dôn") and the Plant Llŷr ("Children of Llŷr"). Some figures in Insular Celtic myth have ancient continental parallels: Irish Lugh and Welsh Lleu are cognate with Lugus, Goibniu and Gofannon with Gobannos, Macán and Mabon with Maponos, and so on. One common figure is the sovereignty goddess, who represents the land and bestows sovereignty on a king by marrying him. The Otherworld is also a common motif; a parallel realm of the supernatural races, which is visited by some mythical heroes. Celtic myth influenced later Arthurian legend.

Overview

Though the Celtic world at its height covered much of western and central Europe, it was not politically unified nor was there any substantial central source of cultural influence or homogeneity; as a result, there was a great deal of variation in local practices of Celtic religion (although certain motifs, for example the god Lugh, appear to have diffused throughout the Celtic world). Inscriptions of more than three hundred deities, often equated with their Roman counterparts, have survived, but of these most appear to have been genii locorum, local or tribal gods, and few were widely worshiped. However, from what has survived of Celtic mythology, it is possible to discern commonalities which hint at a more unified pantheon than is often given credit.

The nature and functions of these ancient gods can be deduced from their names, the location of their inscriptions, their iconography, the Roman gods they are equated with, and similar figures from later bodies of Celtic mythology.

Celtic mythology is not found in a number of distinct, if related, subgroups, largely corresponding to the branches of the Celtic languages:
 Ancient Celtic religion (known primarily through archaeological sources rather than through written mythology)
 mythology in Goidelic languages, represented chiefly by Irish mythology (also shared with Scottish mythology)
 Mythological Cycle
 Ulster Cycle
 Fenian Cycle
 Cycles of the Kings
 mythology in Brittonic languages
Welsh mythology
Cornish mythology
Breton mythology

Historical sources

As a result of the scarcity of surviving materials bearing written Gaulish, it is surmised that the most of the Celtic writings were destroyed by the Romans, though a written form of Gaulish using Greek, Latin and North Italic alphabets was used (as evidenced by votive items bearing inscriptions in Gaulish and the Coligny calendar). Julius Caesar attests to the literacy of the Gauls, but also wrote that their priests, the druids, were forbidden to use writing to record certain verses of religious significance (Caesar, Commentarii de Bello Gallico 6.14) while also noting that the Helvetii had a written census (Caesar, De Bello Gallico 1.29).

Rome introduced a more widespread habit of public inscriptions, and broke the power of the druids in the areas it conquered; in fact, most inscriptions to deities discovered in Gaul (modern France and Northern Italy), Britain and other formerly (or presently) Celtic-speaking areas post-date the Roman conquest.

Though early Gaels in Ireland and parts of Wales used Ogham script to record short inscriptions (largely personal names), more sophisticated literacy was not introduced to Celtic areas that had not been conquered by Rome until the advent of Christianity. Indeed, many Gaelic myths were first recorded by Christian monks, albeit without most of their original religious meanings.

Irish mythology

The oldest body of myths stemming from the Heroic Age is found only from the early medieval period of Ireland. As Christianity began to take over, the gods and goddesses were slowly eliminated as such from the culture. What survives includes material dealing with the Tuatha Dé Danann and the Fomorians, which forms the basis for the text Cath Maige Tuired, "The Battle of Mag Tuireadh", as well as portions of the history-focused Lebor Gabála Érenn (Book of Invasions). The Tuatha Dé represent the functions of human society such as kingship, crafts and war, while the Fomorians represent chaos and wild nature.

The Dagda
The leader of the gods for the Irish pantheon appears to have been the Dagda. The Dagda was the figure on which male humans and other gods were based because he embodied ideal Irish traits. Celtic gods were also considered to be a clan due to their lack of specialization and unknown origins. The particular character of the Dagda was as a figure of burlesque lampoonery in Irish mythology, and some authors even conclude that he was trusted to be benevolent enough to tolerate jokes at his own expense.

Irish tales depict the Dagda as a figure of power, armed with a club. In Dorset there is a famous outline of an ithyphallic giant called the Cerne Abbas Giant with a club cut into the chalky soil. While this was probably produced in relatively modern times (English Civil War era), it was long thought to be a representation of the Dagda. This has been called into question by recent studies which show that there may have been a representation of what looks like a large drapery hanging from the horizontal arm of the figure, leading to suspicion that this figure actually represents Hercules (Heracles), with the skin of the Nemean lion over his arm and carrying the club he used to kill it. In Gaul, it is speculated that the Dagda is associated with Sucellus, ‘the good striker’, equipped with a hammer and cup.

The Morrígan
The Morrígan was a tripartite battle goddess of the Celts of Ancient Ireland and Scotland. She was known as the Morrígan, but the different sections she was divided into were also referred to as Nemain, Macha, and Badb (among other, less common names), with each representing different aspects of combat. She is most commonly known for her involvement in the Táin Bó Cúailnge.

Lugh/Lug

The god appearing most frequently in the tales is Lugh. He is evidently a residual of the earlier, more widespread god Lugus, whose diffusion in Celtic religion is apparent from the number of place names in which his name appears, occurring across the Celtic world. The most famous of these are the cities of Lugdunum (the modern French city of Lyon), Lugdunum Batavorum (Brittenburg, 10 kilometers west of Leiden in the Netherlands) and Lucus Augusti (the modern Galician city of Lugo). Lug is described in the Celtic myths as the last to be added to the list of deities. In Ireland a festival called the Lughnasadh ( "August") was held in his honor.

Others
Other important goddesses include Brigid (or Brigit), the Dagda's daughter; Aibell, Áine, Macha, and the sovereign goddess, Ériu. Notable is Epona, the horse goddess, celebrated with horse races at the summer festival. Significant Irish gods include Nuada Airgetlám, the first king of the Tuatha Dé Danann; Goibniu, the smith and brewer; Dian Cecht, the patron of healing; and the sea god Manannán mac Lir.

Welsh mythology

Important reflexes of British mythology appear in the Four Branches of the Mabinogi, especially in the names of several characters, such as Rhiannon, Teyrnon, and Brân the Blessed (Bendigeidfran, "Bran [Crow] the Blessed"). Other characters, in all likelihood, derive from mythological sources, and various episodes, such as the appearance of Arawn, a king of the Otherworld seeking the aid of a mortal in his own feuds, and the tale of the hero who cannot be killed except under seemingly contradictory circumstances, can be traced throughout Proto-Indo-European mythology. The children of Llŷr ("Sea" = Irish Ler) in the Second and Third Branches, and the children of Dôn (Danu in Irish and earlier Indo-European tradition) in the Fourth Branch are major figures, but the tales themselves are not primary mythology.

While further mythological names and references appear elsewhere in Welsh narrative and tradition, especially in the tale of Culhwch and Olwen, where we find, for example, Mabon ap Modron ("Divine Son of the Divine Mother"), and in the collected Welsh Triads, not enough is known of the British mythological background to reconstruct either a narrative of creation or a coherent pantheon of British deities. Indeed, though there is much in common with Irish myth, there may have been no unified British mythological tradition per se. Whatever its ultimate origins, the surviving material has been put to good use in the service of literary masterpieces that address the cultural concerns of Wales in the early and later Middle Ages.

Remnants of Gaulish and other mythology

The Celts also worshiped a number of deities of which little more is known than their names. Classical writers preserve a few fragments of legends or myths that may possibly be Celtic.

According to the Syrian rhetorician Lucian, Ogmios was supposed to lead a band of men chained by their ears to his tongue as a symbol of the strength of his eloquence.

The first-century Roman poet Lucan mentions the gods Taranis, Teutates and Esus, but there is little Celtic evidence that these were important deities.

A number of objets d'art, coins, and altars may depict scenes from lost myths, such as the representations of Tarvos Trigaranus or of an equestrian ‘Jupiter’ surmounting the Anguiped (a snake-legged human-like figure). The Gundestrup cauldron has been also interpreted mythically.

Along with dedications giving us god names, there are also deity representations to which no name has yet been attached. Among these are images of a three-headed or three-faced god, a squatting god, a god with a snake, a god with a wheel, and a horseman with a kneeling giant. Some of these images can be found in Late Bronze Age peat bogs in Britain, indicating the symbols were both pre-Roman and widely spread across Celtic culture. The distribution of some of the images has been mapped and shows a pattern of central concentration of an image along with a wide scatter indicating these images were most likely attached to specific tribes and were distributed from some central point of tribal concentration outward along lines of trade. The image of the three-headed god has a central concentration among the Belgae, between the Oise, Marne and Moselle rivers. The horseman with the kneeling giant is centered on either side of the Rhine. These examples seem to indicate regional preferences of a common image stock.

Julius Caesar on Celtic gods and their significance

The classic entry about the Celtic gods of Gaul is by Julius Caesar's history of his war in Gaul. In this he names the five principal gods worshiped in Gaul (according to the practice of his time, he gives the names of the closest equivalent Roman gods) and describes their roles:

Mercury was the most venerated of all the deities and numerous representations of him were to be discovered. Mercury was seen as the originator of all the arts (and is often taken to refer to Lugus for this reason), the supporter of adventurers and of traders, and the mightiest power concerning trade and profit.

Next the Gauls revered Apollo, Mars, Jupiter, and Minerva. Among these divinities Caesar described the Celts as holding roughly equal views as did other populations: Apollo dispels sickness, Minerva encourages skills, Jupiter governs the skies, and Mars influences warfare. MacBain argues that Apollo corresponds to Irish Lugh, Mercury to Manannan mac Lir, Jupiter to the Dagda, Mars to Neit, and Minerva to Brigit.

In addition to these five, Caesar mentions that the Gauls traced their ancestry to Dīs Pater (possibly Irish Donn).

See also
 Banshee
 Cantabrian mythology
 Celtic Christianity
 Fisher King
 Niskai
 Triskelion

References

Bibliography
de Vries, Jan, Keltische Religion (1961).
Duval, Paul-Marie, Les Dieux de la Gaule, new ed. updated and enlarged (1976)
Mac Cana, Proinsias. Celtic Mythology. New York: Hamlyn, 1970. 
Mac Cana, Proinsias, The Learned Tales of Medieval Ireland (Irish Literature – Studies), Dublin Institute for Advanced Studies (1980): 
MacKillop, James, Dictionary of Celtic Mythology. Oxford: Oxford University Press, 1998. 
Maier, Bernhard, Dictionary of Celtic religion and culture, Boydell & Brewer 1997 
O'Rahilly, Thomas F. Early Irish History and Mythology (1991, reissued 1971)
Rolleston, T.W. Celtic Myths and Legends. Dover Publications Inc. (1911, 1990 reprint). 
Rhys, John, Lectures on the Origin and Growth of Religion as Illustrated by Celtic Heathendom 3rd ed. (1898, reprinted 1979)
Sjoestedt, M. L., Gods and Heroes of the Celts. 1949; translated by Myles Dillon. repr. Berkeley, CA: Turtle Press, 1990. 
Squire, Charles. Celtic Myth and Legend. Newcastle Publishing Co. 1975. 
Stercks, Claude, Éléments de cosmogonie celtique (1986)
Vendryes, Joseph; Ernest Tonnelat & B.-O. Unbegaun Les Religions des Celtes, des Germains et des anciens Slaves (1948)

External links

Celtic Art & Cultures: a detailed description of the Gundestrup cauldron
Celtic Religion – What Information do we really have
What We Don't Know About the Ancient Celts

 
Indo-European mythology